The men's hammer throw event at the 2005 Summer Universiade was held on 20 August in Izmir, Turkey.

Results

References
Finals results
Full results

Athletics at the 2005 Summer Universiade
2005